Cumnock (Cumnag in Gaelic) is a town in East Ayrshire, Scotland. It may also refer to:

Places
Cumnock, Louisiana, United States
Cumnock, New South Wales, Australia
Cumnock, North Carolina, United States
Cumnock, Ontario, Canada

Others
Cumnock and Doon Valley (Scottish Gaelic: Cumnag agus Srath Dhùin), was one of nineteen local government districts in the Strathclyde region of Scotland from 1973 to 1996
Cumnock and Holmhead, a police burgh of Ayrshire, Scotland
Cumnock Formation, a geologic formation in North Carolina
Mount Cumnock, Jasper National Park of Alberta, Canada
New Cumnock, a town in East Ayrshire, Scotland

People
Arthur Cumnock (1868–1930), American football player
Minnie Cumnock Blodgett (1862–1931), American philanthropist who financed establishment of a Euthenics program

See also
Cumnock RFC, a rugby union club based in East Ayrshire